This article lists notable fantasy novels (and novel series).  The books appear in alphabetical order by title (beginning with I to R) (ignoring "A", "An", and "The"); series are alphabetical by author-designated name or, if there is no such, some reasonable designation. Science-fiction novels and short-story collections are not included here.

I

The Idylls of the Queen by Phyllis Ann Karr
Ile-Rien series by Martha Wells
The Immortals series by Tamora Pierce
Incarnations of Immortality series by Piers Anthony
The Incorruptibles by John Hornor Jacobs 
Inda (novel) by Sherwood Smith
In the Forests of Serre by Patricia McKillip
The Infernal Desire Machines of Doctor Hoffman (aka The War of Dreams) by Angela Carter
Ingo series by Helen Dunmore
The Inheritance Cycle by Christopher Paolini
Eragon, Eldest, Brisingr, Inheritance
Inheritance by Steven Savile
Ink Exchange | Wicked Lovely by Melissa Marr
Inkheart Trilogy by Cornelia Funke
Inkheart, Inkspell, Inkdeath
The Invisible Library series by Genevieve Cogman
The Invisible Library, The Masked City, The Burning Page, The Lost Plot
Islandia  by Austin Tappan Wright
The Infernal Devices trilogy by Cassandra Clare
Clockwork Angel, Clockwork Prince, Clockwork Princess

J
Jade City by Fonda Lee
James and the Giant Peach by Roald Dahl
Jonathan Strange & Mr. Norrell by Susanna Clarke
Journalists (novel) by Sergei Aman

K
Kai Lung series by Ernest Bramah
Kandide and the Secret of the Mists by Diana S. Zimmerman
The Kane Chronicles by Rick Riordan
Kellory the Warlock by Lin Carter
Keeper of the Lost Cities by Shannon Messenger 
Kesrick by Lin Carter
The Keys to the Kingdom by Garth Nix
 The Khaavren Romances by Steven Brust
Khaled: A Tale of Arabia by F. Marion Crawford
 The Kin of Ata Are Waiting for You, by Dorothy Bryant
The King in Yellow by Robert W. Chambers
The King of Elfland's Daughter  by Lord Dunsany
King Rat by China Miéville
Kingdoms of Elfin by Sylvia Townsend Warner
The Kingdoms of Thorn and Bone by Greg Keyes
Kingfisher by Patricia A. McKillip
The Kingkiller Chronicle by Patrick Rothfuss
Krondor's Sons (The Riftwar Stories) by Raymond E. Feist
Kushiel's Legacy by Jacqueline Carey

L
The Land Across by Gene Wolfe
The Last Dragon by Silvana De Mari
The Last Unicorn by Peter S. Beagle
The Last Voyage of Somebody the Sailor by John Barth
Latro series by Gene Wolfe
The Lays of Anuskaya series by Bradley Beaulieu
The Lays of Beleriand by J. R. R. Tolkien
Legends & Lattes by Travis Baldree
Legends of the Riftwar by Raymond E. Feist
Legendborn by Tracy Deonn
Letters from a Lost Uncle by Mervyn Peake
The Library at Mount Char by Scott Hawkins
The Lies of Locke Lamora by Scott Lynch
Life of Pi by Yann Martel
The Life and Opinions of the Tomcat Murr by E. T. A. Hoffmann
Lilith  by George MacDonald
The Little Grey Men by BB
The Little White Horse by Elizabeth Goudge
Little People by Tom Holt
Little, Big by John Crowley
Lolly Willowes by Sylvia Townsend Warner
Long Black Curl by Alex Bledsoe
The Long Look by Richard Parks
The Long Price Quartet series by Daniel Abraham
The Lord of the Rings by J. R. R. Tolkien
The Lost Continent: The Story of Atlantis by C. J. Cutcliffe Hyne 
Lost Tales by J. R. R. Tolkien
Lud-in-the-Mist  by Hope Mirrlees
Lyonesse series by Jack Vance
Lyra series by Patricia Wrede

M 
M is for Magic series by Neil Gaiman
The Magic City by E. Nesbit
The Magician Out of Manchuria by Charles G. Finney
The Magician Trilogy by Jenny Nimmo
The Magicians by Lev Grossman
Magyk by Angie Sage
Malazan Book of the Fallen series by Steven Erikson
The Malloreon by David and Leigh Eddings
The Man Who Was Thursday by G. K. Chesterton
Mandricardo by Lin Carter
Marianne by Sheri S. Tepper
The Mark of the Demons by John Jakes
Martin Dressler  by Steven Millhauser
Mary Poppins series by P. L. Travers
The Mask of the Sorcerer by Darrell Schweitzer
The Master and Margarita by Mikhail Bulgakov
Master Li by Barry Hughart
Matilda by Roald Dahl
May Bird and the Ever After  series by Jodie Lynn Anderson
Mention My Name in Atlantis by John Jakes
Merlin's Ring by H. Warner Munn
The Merman's Children by Poul Anderson
Mickelsson's Ghosts by John Gardner
Millroy the Magician by Paul Theroux
Mistress Masham's Repose by T. H. White
Mistborn series by Brandon Sanderson
The Mists of Avalon by Marion Zimmer Bradley
Memory, Sorrow, and Thorn by Tad Williams
Moonheart by Charles de Lint
The Mortal Instruments series by Cassandra Clare
Mr. Magorium's Wonder Emporium by Suzanne Weyn
Mr. Pye by Mervyn Peake
The Murders of Molly Southbourne by Tade Thompson
Myth Adventures series by Robert Asprin

N

The Nightrunner Series by Lynn Flewelling
The Name of the Wind by Patrick Rothfuss
The Chronicles of Narnia series by C.S. Lewis
The Neverending Story by Michael Ende
Neverwhere by Neil Gaiman
A Night in the Lonesome October by Roger Zelazny
The Night Land by William Hope Hodgson
Nights at the Circus by Angela Carter
Nothing But Blue Skies by Tom Holt
Number9Dream by David Mitchell
The Named by Marianne Curley

O
The Obernewtyn Chronicles by Isobelle Carmody
Od Magic by Patricia McKillip
Oksa Pollock series by Anne Plichota and Cendrine Wolf
Ombria in Shadow by Patricia McKillip
On Stranger Tides by Tim Powers
The Once and Future King series by T.H. White
Orlando by Virginia Woolf
Our Ancestors a set by Italo Calvino
Overtime by Tom Holt
Oz series (40 "canonical" titles) by L. Frank Baum (original creator and author of 14 books of the series), Ruth Plumly Thompson (19 books), Rachel R. Cosgrove (1 book), John R. Neill (author of 3 books), Jack Snow (2 books), and Eloise Jarvis McGraw & Lauren McGraw Wagner  (1 book as co-authors)

P

Paint Your Dragon by Tom Holt
The Paladin by C. J. Cherryh
 Pandava Quintet by Roshani Chokshi 
Passing Strange by Ellen Klages
Peace  by Gene Wolfe
Pellinor by Alison Croggon
Pellucidar series by Edgar Rice Burroughs
The Pendragon Adventure by D. J. MacHale
Percy Jackson & The Olympians by Rick Riordan
The Perilous Gard by Elizabeth Marie Pope
Peter and Wendy aka Peter Pan by J. M. Barrie
Peter Pan in Kensington Gardens by J. M. Barrie
Phantastes by George MacDonald
Pilgermann by Russell Hoban
Pinocchio by Carlo Collodi
The Piratica Series by Tanith Lee
The Place of the Lion by Charles Williams
Policeman Bluejay by L. Frank Baum
The Poppy War by R. F. Kuang
Portrait of Jennie by Robert Nathan
The Power of Five Series (a.k.a. The Gatekeepers Series) by Anthony Horowitz
Practical Magic by Alice Hoffman
Prince of Nothing trilogy by R. Scott Bakker
The Princes of the Golden Cage by Nathalie Mallet
The Princess Bride by William Goldman
Promise of Blood by Brian McClellan
Protector of the Small series by Tamora Pierce
The Chronicles of Prydain by Lloyd Alexander

Q
The Quest of Kadji by Lin Carter
Quidditch Through The Ages by J.K. Rowling
The Quentaris Chronicles by various Australian writers
Queste by Angie Sage

R
The Rage of Dragons by Evan Winter
Ranger's Apprentice series by John Flanagan
The Raven Cycle by Maggie Stiefvater
The Raven Tower by Ann Leckie
Raybearer duology by Jordan Ifueko
Red Moon and Black Mountain by Joy Chant
Red Sister by Mark Lawrence
The Red Threads of Fortune by JY Yang
Redwall by Brian Jacques
The Revenants by Sheri S. Tepper
A Riddle of Roses by Caryl Cude Mullin
The Riddle-Master trilogy by Patricia A. McKillip
Riftwar series by Raymond E. Feist
Rose Daughter by Robin McKinley
Roverandom by J. R. R. Tolkien
The Runelords series by David Farland
Rusalka by C. J. Cherryh

See also
List of science fiction publishers

References

 
Novels (I-R)
Lists of books by genre
Lists of novels